Max Duffy (born 11 April 1993) is an Australian  American football punter who is currently a free agent. He was formerly the punter for the Kentucky Wildcats and formerly an Australian rules footballer who played for the Fremantle Football Club in the Australian Football League (AFL).

Duffy attended Kent Street Senior High School.

He mainly played basketball as a junior and only converted to Australian rules football after missing selection in a state squad. He was not selected in the first two AFL drafts that he nominated for, and was working as a tree lopper while playing for East Fremantle in the West Australian Football League (WAFL) when he was recruited with 39th draft pick in the 2012 AFL Draft.

Australian football career
Due to a series of shoulder and hamstring injuries, Duffy spent significant periods of the 2013 and 2014 seasons out of the game. He made his debut for the Fremantle Football Club in round 20, 2014 against Geelong following some good form in the WAFL for Peel.  After starting the game as the substitute, he kicked a goal with his first kick in the AFL and kicked a second goal late in the last quarter, however, Fremantle lost by two points.

Duffy was delisted at the conclusion of the 2015 season.
He then joined West Perth in the WAFL for the 2016 season. Prior to the 2017 season, however, he announced his retirement from Australian to train to become an American football punter.

American football career
In December 2017, Duffy was signed by the Kentucky Wildcats as a punter.  Ray Guy’s ProKicker.com rated him as the top 2018 punting prospect. Duffy earned GPR Analytics National Punter of the Year in 2019 with an NCAA leading 98.30 GPR Punt Rating

Duffy was drafted by the Toronto Argonauts in the fourth round of the 2021 CFL Global Draft on 15 April 2021. He signed with the Denver Broncos of the NFL as an undrafted free agent on 24 May 2021. He was waived on June 17.

Pittsburgh Maulers
On 10 March 2022, Duffy was drafted by the Pittsburgh Maulers of the United States Football League.

Statistics
Statistics are correct to the end of the 2015 season

|-
|- style="background-color: #EAEAEA"
! scope="row" style="text-align:center" | 2014
|style="text-align:center;"|
| 24 || 2 || 2 || 1 || 7 || 3 || 10 || 2 || 0 || 1.0 || 0.5 || 3.5 || 1.5 || 5.0 || 1.0 || 0.0
|- 
! scope="row" style="text-align:center" | 2015
|style="text-align:center;"|
| 24 || 1 || 1 || 0 || 5 || 7 || 12 || 3 || 1 || 1.0 || 0.0 || 5.0 || 7.0 || 12.5 || 3.0 || 1.0
|- class="sortbottom"
! colspan=3| Career
! 3
! 3
! 1
! 12
! 10
! 22
! 5
! 1
! 1.0
! 0.3
! 4.0
! 3.3
! 7.3
! 1.7
! 0.3
|}

References

External links

Max Duffy's WAFL statistics

1993 births
Living people
American football punters
Australian players of American football
Australian rules footballers from Western Australia
Denver Broncos players
Kentucky Wildcats football players
Fremantle Football Club players
East Fremantle Football Club players
Peel Thunder Football Club players
West Perth Football Club players
People educated at Kent Street Senior High School
All-American college football players
Pittsburgh Maulers (2022) players